Cheng Cheng-mount is a Taiwanese politician who served as the Vice Chairperson of Financial Supervisory Commission since 1 November 2016.

Education
Cheng obtained his bachelor's degree in economics from National Taiwan University in 1985 and master's degree in economics from University of Wisconsin–Madison in the United States in 1989.

Careers
He was the assistant research fellow at Taiwan Institute of Economic Research in 1998–2002, chief economist at Citibank Taiwan in 2002–2012, adjunct assistant professor of Department of Finance of National Chengchi University in 2011, president of Academy of Banking and Finance in 2012–2015 and president of Agricultural Bank of Taiwan in 2015–2016. On the 1st of October 2020, Mr. Cheng Cheng-Mount was elected chairman of the Taiwanese shipping carrier Yang Ming  Marine Transport Corporation.

References

Living people
National Taiwan University alumni
Political office-holders in the Republic of China on Taiwan
University of Wisconsin–Madison alumni
Year of birth missing (living people)